Progress M-51, identified by NASA as Progress 16P, was a Progress spacecraft used to resupply the International Space Station. It was a Progress-M 11F615A55 spacecraft, with the serial number 351.

Launch
Progress M-51 was launched by a Soyuz-U carrier rocket from Site 1/5 at the Baikonur Cosmodrome. Launch occurred at 22:19:34 UTC on 23 December 2004.

Docking
The spacecraft docked with the aft port of the Zvezda module at 23:57:45 UTC on 25 December 2004. It remained docked for 64 days before undocking at 16:06:30 UTC on 27 February 2005. to make way for Progress M-52 Between undocking and deorbit, Progress M-51 was used for a series of tests. It was deorbited at 16:17:00 UTC on 9 March 2005. The spacecraft burned up in the atmosphere over the Pacific Ocean, with any remaining debris landing in the ocean at around 17:03:11 UTC.

Progress M-51 carried supplies to the International Space Station, including food, water and oxygen for the crew and equipment for conducting scientific research.

See also

 List of Progress flights
 Uncrewed spaceflights to the International Space Station

References

Spacecraft launched in 2004
Progress (spacecraft) missions
Spacecraft which reentered in 2005
Supply vehicles for the International Space Station
Spacecraft launched by Soyuz-U rockets